"Darts of Pleasure" is the debut single of Glasgow-based indie rock band Franz Ferdinand, released in the United Kingdom on 8 September 2003 through Domino Records. The song entered the UK Singles Chart at number 44 on 15 September 2003, where it stayed for one week. The band were happy with its chart performance, commenting "we couldn't believe we were in the UK top 50."

History and content
The band developed its reputation by supporting Hot Hot Heat and Interpol. NME editor Connor McNicholas said, "My first contact with Franz Ferdinand was when someone was playing the Darts of Pleasure demos, in the NME office, and it was genuinely one of those moments when a track goes on and I come bundling out of my office saying 'what the hell is this because this is amazing'". It was therefore no surprise the band won the "Phillip Hall Radar Award" at the NME Awards of 2004 (announced in late 2003). Furthermore, NME described the band as "The Next Big Thing" and featured the band on the front cover describing them as "The Band That Will Change Your Life".

Alex Kapranos explained to Q magazine that "the song is about seduction and the 'Darts of Pleasure' that hit you are actually words."

The song ends with several lyrics in German, most famously the line "Ich heiße Super Fantastisch!" ("My name is Super-Fantastic!", whereas "Super-Fantastic" is the name, not an adjective. Although variations in the German language occur, making the true meaning "I am called Super-Fantastic!").

Release and reception
"Darts of Pleasure" was released on 8 September 2003. The single was received well with Pitchfork Media giving it a rating of 8.3. AllMusic gave it 3.5 stars and the NME gave a very enthusiastic response. With the release Franz were acclaimed as "the saviours of rock and roll" by John Peel who gave them airtime.

Track listings
Lead vocals are performed by Alex Kapranos except on "Van Tango" and "Tell Her Tonight", performed by Nick McCarthy.

UK 7-inch
A. "Darts of Pleasure" 
B. "Shopping for Blood" 

UK CD and 12-inch single
 "Darts of Pleasure" 
 "Van Tango" 
 "Shopping for Blood" 

US CD EP
 "Darts of Pleasure" 
 "Van Tango" 
 "Shopping for Blood" 
 "Tell Her Tonight" (home demo) 
 "Darts of Pleasure" (home demo)

Personnel
Alex Kapranos – lead vocals, lead and rhythm guitar, prudction
 Bob Hardy – bass guitar, backing vocals
 Nick McCarthy – rhythm and lead guitar, backing vocals
 Paul Thomson – drums, percussion, backing vocals
 Tore Johansson - production
 Adrian Breakspear – assistant engineering

Charts

References

2003 debut singles
2003 songs
Domino Recording Company singles
Franz Ferdinand (band) songs
Macaronic songs
Songs written by Alex Kapranos
Songs written by Bob Hardy (bassist)
Songs written by Nick McCarthy
Songs written by Paul Thomson